Edmund Franklin Ward (January 3, 1892 – December 14, 1990) was an American illustrator who illustrated for the Saturday Evening Post and did his first illustrations for the magazine before turning age 20. He had a successful career as an illustrator of works that ranged in style and subject matter from dark tonalist in oils to humorous in wash and watercolor. For many years he illustrated the Alexander Botts and Assistant District Attorney Doowinkle stories for the Saturday Evening Post.

Ward studied at the Art Students League in the same class with Norman Rockwell. The two students became friends, and shared a studio in the attic of a Manhattan brownstone.
  Among his teachers were Edward Dufner, George Bridgman and Thomas Fogarty. He later moved to the Manhattan suburb of New Rochelle, a well known artist colony and home to many of the top commercial illustrators of the day including friend Norman Rockwell.  At the time more than fifty percent of the illustrations in the country’s leading publications were done by artists from New Rochelle.  He spent his professional career in White Plains, where he painted a mural for the Federal Building.  He was a longtime member of the Salmagundi Club, the Guild of Free Lance Artists, and was a member of the Society of Illustrators.

Gallery

References

External links
 
 

1892 births
1990 deaths
Artists from New Rochelle, New York
American magazine illustrators